Trolley Troubles is a 1927 animated short subject film, produced by Charles Mintz and George Winkler and directed by Walt Disney. The cartoon is the first appearance of Oswald the Lucky Rabbit, a character that Disney and Ub Iwerks created for Universal Pictures and Charles B. Mintz.

History
In the early summer of 1927, Walt Disney finished the first Oswald cartoon, entitled Poor Papa. However, Universal was not very satisfied. They had expected a more Charlie Chaplin-like character and thought Oswald was too elderly and too fat. Disney agreed to make some changes and the cartoon was not released in theatres at the time.

Instead, Oswald's second-produced cartoon was submitted for release: Trolley Troubles. Universal was pleased and the short was released by Universal on September 5, 1927.

The press loved the new cartoon series Walt made and Oswald became a true hero. From that moment on, a new cartoon was released every two weeks.

As for Poor Papa, it was released eventually in theatres, although Universal held it back until 1928. In total, nine Oswald cartoons were released in 1927.

The cartoon was reissued on November 23, 1931 after Walter Lantz Productions took over the Oswald series. This re-release was completed with music and sound effects.

The copyright for Trolley Troubles expired in 1955.

Plot
Oswald is preparing a trolley (tram) to transport his bunny kids and other animal characters, but there are some obstacles. The first is Clarabelle Cow who walks onto the tracks and refuses to move until Oswald drives the trolley underneath her. Oswald thinks that all is well until the hill gets steep. Oswald uses a goat to get the trolley up the hill, then down the hill.

The trolley unexpectedly goes onto a bumpy road, tossing the kids out of the trolley. Oswald prays that he will live, takes off his foot, and rubs it on his head (as per the saying that a rabbit's foot gives you good luck). Eventually, the trolley crashes into a river and becomes a raft. Oswald uses a big stick to row it downstream.

Home media
The short was released on December 11, 2007 on Walt Disney Treasures: The Adventures of Oswald the Lucky Rabbit.

References

External links

1920s Disney animated short films
1927 films
American black-and-white films
Oswald the Lucky Rabbit cartoons
1927 animated films
1927 short films
Films directed by Walt Disney
American silent short films
Universal Pictures short films
Universal Pictures animated short films
Animated films about animals
Animated films without speech
Rail transport films
1920s American films
Silent American comedy films
Surviving American silent films